Wet rot is a generic term used to define a variety of fungal species, such as Coniophora puteana (otherwise known as cellar fungus) and Choanephora cucurbitarum. Some species obtain their food by breaking down the cell walls of wood, resulting in a loss of its strength. This can cause problems in the structural integrity of structures. The species C. cucurbitarum affects the flowers and fruit of crops, such as amaranthus and okra.

The Environmental Protection Agency (EPA) states that “In addition, mold exposure can irritate the eyes, skin, nose, throat, and lungs of both mold-allergic and non-allergic people.”

See also
 Dry rot

References

External links
 
 

Fungi by adaptation
Wood decomposition
Amaranthus
Zygomycota